Pastur may refer to

 Leonid Pastur (born 1937), Ukrainian mathematician and physicist
 Paul Pastur (1866–1938), Belgian lawyer and politician
 Château Pastur, Jodoigne, Belgium